Eolepadomorpha is an extinct order of barnacles in the class Thecostraca. There are 2 families and about 14 described species in Eolepadomorpha.

Families
These families and genera belong to the order Eolepadomorpha:
 Order Eolepadomorpha Chan et al., 2021
 Family Eolepadidae Buckeridge, 1983
 Genus Eolepas Withers, 1928
 Genus Toarcolepas Gale & Schweigert, 2015
 Family Praelepadidae Chernyshev, 1930
 Genus Illilepas Schram, 1986
 Genus Praelepas Chernyshev, 1930

References

Barnacles